4J or 4-J may refer to:
4J Studios, a Scottish video game developer
Somon Air's IATA code
Eugene School District's designator
4J Road, a section of Wyoming Highway 50
4J, the production code for the 1975 Doctor Who serial The Android Invasion

In aircraft:
TA-4J, a model of Douglas A-4 Skyhawk
F-4J Phantom, see McDonnell Douglas F-4 Phantom II
F-4J Phantom II, see List of McDonnell Douglas F-4 Phantom II variants
F-4J(UK), see McDonnell Douglas F-4 Phantom II non-U.S. operators
L-4J, a model of Piper J-3

See also
J4 (disambiguation)